Gushlu (also Romanized as Gūshlū; also known as Kūshlū) is a village in Savalan Rural District, in the Central District of Parsabad County, Ardabil Province, Iran. At the 2006 census, its population was 1,680, in 355 families.

References 

Towns and villages in Parsabad County